Smarties are colour-varied sugar-coated chocolate confectionery. They have been manufactured since 1937, originally by H.I. Rowntree & Company in the United Kingdom, and now by Nestlé.

Smarties are oblate spheroids with a minor axis of about 5 mm (0.2 in) and a major axis of about 12 mm (0.5 in). They come in eight colours: red, orange, yellow, green, blue, mauve, pink and brown, although the blue variety was temporarily replaced by a white variety in some countries, whilst an alternative natural colouring dye of the blue colour was being researched.

Smarties are sold primarily in Europe, Canada, South Africa, Australasia and the Middle East. Smarties are not distributed (except via parallel import) in the United States, where the rights to the name belong to the Smarties Candy Company, which manufactures its own hard tablet sweet under the registered trademark name Smarties.

History
Rowntree's of York, England, have been making "Chocolate Beans" since at least 1882. The product was renamed "Smarties Chocolate Beans" in 1937. Rowntree's was forced to drop the words "chocolate beans" in 1937 due to trading standards requirements (the use of the word "beans" was felt to be misleading) so adopted the "Milk Chocolate in a Crisp Sugar Shell". Later, the sweet was rebranded as "Smarties".

Smarties in the UK were formerly sold in cylindrical cardboard tubes, capped with a colourful plastic lid usually having a letter of the alphabet on it. The purpose of this, according to a Rowntree's spokesperson in the 1980s, was for them to be useful as a teaching aid to encourage young children to recognise the letters. Over the last 25 years, Nestlé and Rowntree's have manufactured five billion Smarties lids. Some lids are very rare and are now regarded as collectors' items.

In February 2005, the Smarties tube was replaced with a hexagonal design. The rationale behind changing the design was, according to Nestlé, to make the brand "fresh and appealing" to youngsters; the new packaging is also lighter and more compact, and the lid (which is now a hinged piece of cardboard) has a card clip which holds the lid shut when it is folded over. The new lid still features a letter like the old plastic lids, but it is in the form of a "what [letter] is a [thing]?" question similar to those asked on the television game show Blockbusters (which coincidentally were on hexagonal tiles), the answer for which can be read when the lid is open, next to the hole giving access to the rest of the tube. The hexagonal box is made of one piece of card which is diecut then folded and glued. The hexagon can also be stacked in many layers without the pile collapsing, which is an advantage at the point of sale.

Smarties are no longer manufactured in York; in October 2007, production was moved to Germany, where a third of them were already made. Outside Europe, Nestlé's largest production facility for Smarties is in Toronto, Canada, where Nestlé has been manufacturing its products since 1918. The factory located at 72 Sterling Road in the Junction Triangle was originally built for Cowan Cocoa and Chocolate.

In 1998, Nestlé obtained a trademark for a tubular Smarties package. It later sued Master Foods in Denmark, which was marketing M&M minis in a similar package. The Supreme Court of Denmark ruled that a basic geometrical shape could not be trademarked and ordered the trademark to be removed from the trademark register.

Colours

In one of the earlier ranges of colours, there was a light-brown Smartie. This was replaced in 1988 by a blue Smartie, introduced as part of campaign opposing the purchase of Rowntree Mackintosh Confectionery by Nestlé, along with 'I Support Blue Smarties' pin badges. Before 1958, dark-brown Smarties had a plain-chocolate centre, while light-brown ones were coffee-flavoured. Orange Smarties originally contained orange-flavoured chocolate, however, these days the orange flavour is added to the shell only.

In 2006, it was announced that Nestlé was removing all artificial colourings from Smarties in the United Kingdom. Nestlé decided to replace all synthetic dyes with natural ones, but, unable to source a natural blue dye, removed blue Smarties from circulation (which led to the common misunderstanding that the blue Smartie triggered hyperactivity in some children) and replaced them with white ones. In February 2008, blue smarties were reintroduced using natural blue dye derived from the cyanobacterium spirulina instead of the controversial brilliant blue FCF (FD&C Blue 1, E133).

Artificial colouring was removed from Smarties on the Canadian market in March 2009. The new range included all the colours except blue. Blue Smarties were re-added in May 2010.

Red Smarties were previously dyed with cochineal, a derivative of the product made by extracting colour from female cochineal insects. A pigment extracted from red cabbage is now used in the United Kingdom.

For the purposes of assessing an "active learning approach to epidemiology and critical appraisal", a mock randomised controlled trial tested the hypothesis that red Smarties could increase happiness. Based on a trial with 117 participants in four settings in Australia, Canada and Malaysia, red Smarties eaters were no happier than yellow Smarties eaters.

Variants

Smarties are also sold in the form of chocolate bars and eggs with fragments of Smarties in them, and chocolate-and-vanilla ice cream with Smarties pieces in it known as Smarties Fusion. A variant on Smarties ice cream is the Smarties McFlurry, sold by McDonald's. It was discontinued temporarily in 2012, brought back in early 2014 but withdrawn again in late 2015, being replaced with Oreo, but in some countries both are available. For decades Canadian Dairy Queen restaurants offered a Smarties Blizzard, but in 2015 this was dropped and replaced with an M&M's Blizzard. The Smarties Blizzard returned to the menu in early 2018.

In 1997, larger-sized Giant Smarties were introduced, and, in 2004, Fruity Smarties. Another variation of Smarties, which contained white chocolate rather than milk chocolate, was also introduced. These were trialled as "Smarctic Frost Bites", but upon their full release a year or so later, they were called White Chocolate Smarties.

In 1998, a product known as "Smarties Secrets" was introduced which contained sweets of varying designs, colours and flavours. The packaging also contained a small comic book. This product is no longer available.

In Canada, there was a limited line of red and white Smarties where the white Smarties have an image of a red maple leaf, a reference to the Canadian flag. Holiday packaging for Halloween (sold as Scaries), Christmas and Valentine's Day (containing only pink and red Smarties) is common. Also in Canada, Nestlé sells Peanut and Peanut Butter Smarties.

Around Christmas, Nestlé Australia and Canada often releases Smarties in the Christmas colours of red, green and white.

In other countries, like Canada, there is more variety in packaging. Smarties can be purchased in rectangular boxes, a giant tube, or in a stand-up or paper bag, and in 410 g bags in Australia and New Zealand.

In the United States a Smarties variant was introduced by Nestlé for a limited time as part of a product promotion for Disney's animation feature "Tarzan" in 1999. "Tarzan Treats" had red, green, brown, blue, orange and yellow Smarties pieces. Yellow pieces contained an outline graphic of characters from the film. This Smarties variant was made in Canada for distribution in the United States.

Advertising slogans

UK and Ireland

The Smarties slogan, "Only Smarties have the answer", has been used since 1989. However, the previous slogan, "Do you eat the red ones last?", is still occasionally used.

In the 1950s and 1960s, the phrase "Buy some for Lulu" was sung as a tagline in commercials. In the end of the commercial, a boy/girl (usually a teacher or cowboy etc.) says the phrase and walks off, leaving the Rowntree text and the Smartie packaging on the screen for five seconds. This was before the rise of the singer Lulu.  Lulu was one of the daughters of a developer of the advert, Richard Oxby.

There was also a song called "A Handful of Smarties," written by Gerald Masters, which also aired in Europe, The Caribbean and Jamaica.

Canada
The words for the Canadian advertising jingle from the 1970s until the mid-1990s were:

When you eat your Smarties, do you eat the red ones last?
Do you suck them very slowly, or crunch them very fast?
Eat those candy-coated chocolates, but tell me when I ask:
When you eat your Smarties, do you eat the red ones last?

This jingle was set to the tune of Lonnie Donegan's "Does Your Chewing Gum Lose Its Flavour (On the Bedpost Overnight?)".

The 2008 advertising campaign showed various people singing "Everyday People" by Sly and the Family Stone.

, the slogan is "Show 'your' colours!" However, the redesigned 2015 box seems to have reverted to the original "Do you eat the red ones last?" slogan.

Germany
The German Smarties slogan is "Viele, viele bunte Smarties" (which translates as "lots and lots of colourful Smarties").

Slovakia
The Slovak Smarties slogan is "Farebný svet v hrsti!" (which roughly translates to "Colourful world in the palm of your hand!").

South Africa
In South Africa the slogan is "Wot a lot I got". This is often printed on one of the sides of the Smarties box in brown lettering simply as a single word, "Wotalotigot".

See also
 Nestlé Smarties Book Prize
 Galaxy Minstrels
 Reese's Pieces
 Smarties: Meltdown
 Skittles
 M&M's

References

External links

 
 Smartie Museum
 How Smarties are made
 Smarties set to lose their tube - BBC news

British confectionery
Canadian confectionery
Rowntree's brands
Yorkshire cuisine
1882 introductions
Products introduced in 1938
Brand name confectionery
Candy